Pantheerankavu or Pantheerankavu is a small town near Kozhikode city in India.It is located  away from Kozhikode city.

Pantheerankavu 
Pantheerankave or Pantheerankavu means, the place with Twelve Kavu(Temples) which are from Kodal Nadakkavu, arappuzha, moorkkanadu, puthurmadham, kunnathupalam, kaimpalam, manakkadavu, muthuvanathara, poolenkara. Pantheerankavu formerly known as Kailamadham.

Demographics
Today Pantheeramkavu is a fast-growing town with a population of 45,495. Pantheeramkavu has an average literacy rate of 84%, higher than the national average of 59.5%: male literacy is 86%, and female literacy is 82%. In Pantheeramkavu, 11% of the population is under 6 years of age.

Location
The new  National Highway 66 bypass is passing through the heart of Pantheeramkave which is connecting the entire kerala.

Suburbs and villages
 Manakkadavu 
 Poolenkara
 Nambi Kulam
 Kodal Nadakkavu
 Palazhy
 Iringallur
 Arappuzha
 Azhinjilam
 Muthuvanatthara

Important Landmarks
 The Oxford School, Opposite Decathlon, ByePass Road
 Murukanad Subramanya Temple, Kodalnadakkavu
 Kailamadom School, Perumanna Road
 Vishnu Temple Pantheerankavu
 Ayyappa Madam Pantheerankavu
 Ganesa Sadhanam Kendram Pantheerankavu
 Pantheerankavu High School
 Thonderikavu (Temple)
 Kodumbaramb bhagavathy temple
 Panchajanya kalasamskarika vedi
Stuid Learning app

Location

See also
 Airport Road, Kozhikode

References

External links

Cities and towns in Kozhikode district
Kozhikode south